Route 101 is a  north–south state highway in Massachusetts. Its southern terminus is at Route 32 in Petersham and its northern terminus is at Route 119 in Ashburnham. Along the way it intersects several major highways including Route 2 and Route 2A in Templeton and Route 12 in Ashburnham.

Route description

Route 101 begins in Petersham at Route 32, just north of the center of town.  The route heads eastward, winding between two wildlife management areas and south of Queen Lake as it passes through Phillipston.  In Templeton, the route joins Route 2A, passing concurrently with that route over Route 2 at Exit 83 (formerly 21) before splitting again.

From Templeton, Route 101 enters the city of Gardner, acting as one of the main streets through town.  For two blocks west of Main Street, Route 101 runs concurrently with Route 68.  The route crosses Route 140 before entering Ashburnham.  In Ashburnham, Route 101 heads into the center of town, sharing a short concurrency along Route 12 before turning northward, passing by Winnekeag Lake and west of Ward Pond before ending at Route 119, three miles south of the New Hampshire state line and 300 yards east of the Ashby town line.  

During the 1920s and early 1930s, Route 101 was a multi-state route through Massachusetts, Rhode Island, and Connecticut, primarily along the highway now known as U.S. Route 44.

Major intersections

References

External links

101
Transportation in Worcester County, Massachusetts